On March 1, 1932, Charles Augustus Lindbergh Jr. (born June 22, 1930), the 20-month-old son of aviators Charles Lindbergh and Anne Morrow Lindbergh, was abducted from his crib in the upper floor of the Lindberghs' home, Highfields, in East Amwell, New Jersey, United States. On May 12, the child's corpse was discovered by a truck driver by the side of a nearby road.

In September 1934, a German immigrant carpenter named Bruno Richard Hauptmann was arrested for the crime. After a trial that lasted from January 2 to February 13, 1935, he was found guilty of first-degree murder and sentenced to death. Despite his conviction, he continued to profess his innocence, but all appeals failed and he was executed in the electric chair at the New Jersey State Prison on April 3, 1936. Hauptmann's guilt or lack thereof continues to be debated in the modern day. Newspaper writer H. L. Mencken called the kidnapping and trial "the biggest story since the Resurrection". Legal scholars have referred to the trial as one of the "trials of the century". The crime spurred Congress to pass the Federal Kidnapping Act, commonly called the "Little Lindbergh Law", which made transporting a kidnapping victim across state lines a federal crime.

Kidnapping
At approximately 10 p.m. on March 1, 1932, the Lindberghs' nurse, Betty Gow, found that 20-month-old Charles Augustus Lindbergh Jr. was not with his mother, Anne Morrow Lindbergh, who had just come out of the bathtub. Gow then alerted Charles Lindbergh, who immediately went to the child's room, where he found a ransom note, containing bad handwriting and grammar, in an envelope on the windowsill. Taking a gun, Lindbergh went around the house and grounds with family butler, Olly Whateley; they found impressions in the ground under the window of the baby's room, pieces of a wooden ladder, and a baby's blanket. Whateley telephoned the Hopewell police department while Lindbergh contacted his attorney and friend, Henry Breckinridge, and the New Jersey state police.

Investigation

Hopewell Borough police and New Jersey State Police officers conducted an extensive search of the home and its surrounding area.

After midnight, a fingerprint expert examined the ransom note and ladder; no usable fingerprints or footprints were found, leading experts to conclude that the kidnapper(s) wore gloves and had some type of cloth on the soles of their shoes. No adult fingerprints were found in the baby's room, including in areas witnesses admitted to touching, such as the window, but the baby's fingerprints were found.

The brief, handwritten ransom note had many spelling and grammar irregularities:

At the bottom of the note were two interconnected blue circles surrounding a red circle, with a hole punched through the red circle and two more holes to the left and right.

On further examination of the ransom note by professionals, they found that it was all written by the same person. They determined that due to the odd English, the writer must have been foreign and had spent some, but little, time in America. The FBI then found a sketch artist to make a portrait of the man that they believed to be the kidnapper.

Another attempt on identifying the kidnapper was looking at the ladder that was used in the crime to abduct the child. Police realized that the ladder was not built correctly but was built by someone who knew how to construct with wood and had prior experience in building. The ladder was examined for fingerprints, but none were found. Even slivers of the ladder had been examined, with the police believing that the examination of this evidence would lead to the kidnapper. They had a professional see how many different types of wood were used, pattern made by the nail holes and if it was made indoors or outdoors. This would later be a key element in the trial of the man who was accused of kidnapping the Lindbergh baby.

On March 2, 1932, FBI Director J. Edgar Hoover got in contact with the Trenton New Jersey Police Department. He told the New Jersey police that they could contact the FBI for any resources and would provide any assistance if needed. The FBI did not have federal jurisdiction, until on May 13, 1932 the President declared that the FBI was at the disposal of the New Jersey Police Department and that the FBI should coordinate and conduct the investigation.

The New Jersey State police offered a $25,000 reward for anyone who could provide information pertaining to the case.

On March 4, 1932 a man by the name of Gaston B. Means had a discussion with Evalyn Walsh McLean and told her that he would be of great importance in retrieving the Lindbergh baby. Means told McLean that he could find these kidnappers because he was approached weeks before the abduction about participating in a "big kidnapping" and he claimed that his friend was the kidnapper of the Lindbergh child. The following day, Means told McLean that he had made contact with the person who had the Lindbergh child. He then convinced Mrs. McLean to hand him $100,000 to obtain the child because the ransom money had doubled. McLean obliged because she believed that Means really knew where the child was. She waited for the child's return every day, until she finally asked Means for her money back. He refused, Mrs. McLean reported him to the police, and he was sentenced to fifteen years in prison on embezzlement charges.

Violet Sharpe, who was suspected as a conspirator, died by suicide on June 10, before she was scheduled to be questioned for the fourth time. Her involvement was later ruled out due to her having an alibi for the night of March 1, 1932.

In 1933 Franklin D. Roosevelt announced that the Federal Bureau of Investigation would take full jurisdiction over the case in October 1933.

Prominence

Word of the kidnapping spread quickly. Hundreds of people converged on the estate, destroying any footprint evidence. Along with police, well-connected and well-intentioned people arrived at the Lindbergh estate. Military colonels offered their aid, although only one had law enforcement expertiseHerbert Norman Schwarzkopf, superintendent of the New Jersey State Police. The other colonels were Henry Skillman Breckinridge, a Wall Street lawyer; and William J. Donovan, a hero of the First World War who would later head the Office of Strategic Services (OSS), the forerunner of the CIA. Lindbergh and these men speculated that the kidnapping was perpetrated by organized crime figures. They thought that the letter was written by someone who spoke German as his native language. At this time, Charles Lindbergh used his influence to control the direction of the investigation.

They contacted Mickey Rosner, a Broadway hanger-on rumored to know mobsters. Rosner turned to two speakeasy owners, Salvatore "Salvy" Spitale and Irving Bitz, for aid. Lindbergh quickly endorsed the duo and appointed them his intermediaries to deal with the mob. Several organized crime figures – notably Al Capone, Willie Moretti, Joe Adonis, and Abner Zwillman – spoke from prison, offering to help return the baby in exchange for money or for legal favors. Specifically, Capone offered assistance in return for being released from prison under the pretense that his assistance would be more effective. This was quickly denied by the authorities.

The morning after the kidnapping, authorities notified President Herbert Hoover of the crime. At that time, kidnapping was classified as a state crime and the case did not seem to have any grounds for federal involvement. Attorney General William D. Mitchell met with Hoover and announced that the whole machinery of the Department of Justice would be set in motion to cooperate with the New Jersey authorities.

The Bureau of Investigation (later the FBI) was authorized to investigate the case, while the United States Coast Guard, the U.S. Customs Service, the U.S. Immigration Service and the Metropolitan Police Department of the District of Columbia were told their services might be required. New Jersey officials announced a $25,000 reward for the safe return of "Little Lindy". The Lindbergh family offered an additional $50,000 reward of their own. At this time, the total reward of $75,000 (approximately ) was a tremendous sum of money, because the nation was in the midst of the Great Depression.

On March 6, a new ransom letter arrived by mail at the Lindbergh home. The letter was postmarked March 4 in Brooklyn, and it carried the perforated red and blue marks. The ransom had been raised to $70,000. A third ransom note postmarked from Brooklyn, and also including the secret marks, arrived in Breckinridge's mail. The note told the Lindberghs that John Condon should be the intermediary between the Lindberghs and the kidnapper(s), and requested notification in a newspaper that the third note had been received. Instructions specified the size of the box the money should come in, and warned the family not to contact the police.

John Condon
During this time, John F. Condona well-known Bronx personality and retired school teacheroffered $1,000 if the kidnapper would turn the child over to a Catholic priest. Condon received a letter reportedly written by the kidnappers; it authorized Condon to be their intermediary with Lindbergh.  Lindbergh accepted the letter as genuine.

Following the kidnapper's latest instructions, Condon placed a classified ad in the New York American reading: "Money is Ready. Jafsie." Condon then waited for further instructions from the culprits.

A meeting between "Jafsie" and a representative of the group that claimed to be the kidnappers was eventually scheduled for late one evening at Woodlawn Cemetery in the Bronx. According to Condon, the man sounded foreign but stayed in the shadows during the conversation, and Condon was thus unable to get a close look at his face. The man said his name was John, and he related his story: He was a "Scandinavian" sailor, part of a gang of three men and two women. The baby was being held on a boat, unharmed, but would be returned only for ransom. When Condon expressed doubt that "John" actually had the baby, he promised some proof: the kidnapper would soon return the baby's sleeping suit. The stranger asked Condon, "... would I burn if the package were dead?" When questioned further, he assured Condon that the baby was alive.

On March 16, Condon received a toddler's sleeping suit by mail, and a seventh ransom note. After Lindbergh identified the sleeping suit, Condon placed a new ad in the Home News: "Money is ready. No cops. No secret service. I come alone, like last time." On April 1 Condon received a letter saying it was time for the ransom to be delivered.

Ransom payment 
The ransom was packaged in a wooden box that was custom-made in the hope that it could later be identified. The ransom money included a number of gold certificates; since gold certificates were about to be withdrawn from circulation, it was hoped greater attention would be drawn to anyone spending them. The bills were not marked but their serial numbers were recorded. Some sources credit this idea to Frank J. Wilson, others to Elmer Lincoln Irey.

On April 2, Condon was given a note by an intermediary, an unknown cab driver. Condon met "John" and told him that they had been able to raise only $50,000. The man accepted the money and gave Condon a note saying that the child was in the care of two innocent women.

Discovery of the body

When Allen went into a grove of trees to urinate, he discovered the body of a toddler. The skull was badly fractured and the body decomposed, with evidence of scavenging by animals; there were indications of an attempt at a hasty burial. Gow identified the baby as the missing infant from the overlapping toes of the right foot and a shirt that she had made. It appeared the child had been killed by a blow to the head. Lindbergh insisted on cremation.

In June 1932, officials began to suspect that the crime had been perpetrated by someone the Lindberghs knew. Suspicion fell upon Violet Sharpe, a British household servant at the Morrow home who had given contradictory information regarding her whereabouts on the night of the kidnapping. It was reported that she appeared nervous and suspicious when questioned. She died by suicide on June 10, 1932, by ingesting a silver polish that contained cyanide just before being questioned for the fourth time. Her alibi was later confirmed, and police were criticized for heavy-handedness.

Condon was also questioned by police and his home searched, but nothing suggestive was found. Charles Lindbergh stood by Condon during this time.

John Condon's unofficial investigation
After the discovery of the body, Condon remained unofficially involved in the case. To the public, he had become a suspect and in some circles was vilified. For the next two years, he visited police departments and pledged to find "Cemetery John".

Condon's actions regarding the case were increasingly flamboyant. On one occasion, while riding a city bus, Condon claimed that he saw a suspect on the street and, announcing his secret identity, ordered the bus to stop. The startled driver complied and Condon darted from the bus, although his target eluded him. Condon's actions were also criticized as exploitive when he agreed to appear in a vaudeville act regarding the kidnapping. Liberty magazine published a serialized account of Condon's involvement in the Lindbergh kidnapping under the title "Jafsie Tells All".

Tracking the ransom money

The investigators who were working on the case were soon at a standstill. There were no developments and little evidence of any sort, so police turned their attention to tracking the ransom payments. A pamphlet was prepared with the serial numbers on the ransom bills, and 250,000 copies were distributed to businesses, mainly in New York City. A few of the ransom bills appeared in scattered locations, some as far away as Chicago and Minneapolis, but those spending the bills were never found.

By a presidential order, all gold certificates were to be exchanged for other bills by May 1, 1933. A few days before the deadline, a man brought $2,980 to a Manhattan bank for exchange; it was later realized the bills were from the ransom. He had given his name as J.J. Faulkner of 537 West 149th Street. No one named Faulkner lived at that address, and a Jane Faulkner who had lived there 20 years earlier denied involvement.

Arrest of Hauptmann

During a thirty-month period, a number of the ransom bills were spent throughout New York City. Detectives realized that many of the bills were being spent along the route of the Lexington Avenue subway, which connected the Bronx with the east side of Manhattan, including the German-Austrian neighborhood of Yorkville.

On September 18, 1934, a Manhattan bank teller noticed a gold certificate from the ransom; a New York license plate number (4U-13-41-N.Y) penciled in the bill's margin allowed it to be traced to a nearby gas station. The station manager had written down the license number because his customer was acting "suspicious" and was "possibly a counterfeiter". The license plate belonged to a sedan owned by Richard Hauptmann of 1279 East 222nd Street in the Bronx, an immigrant with a criminal record in Germany. When Hauptmann was arrested, he was carrying a single 20-dollar gold certificate and over $14,000 of the ransom money was found in his garage.

Hauptmann was arrested, interrogated, and beaten at least once throughout the following day and night. Hauptmann stated that the money and other items had been left with him by his friend and former business partner Isidor Fisch. Fisch had died on March 29, 1934, shortly after returning to Germany. Hauptmann stated he learned only after Fisch's death that the shoebox that was left with him contained a considerable sum of money. He kept the money because he claimed that it was owed to him from a business deal that he and Fisch had made. Hauptmann consistently denied any connection to the crime or knowledge that the money in his house was from the ransom.

When the police searched Hauptmann's home, they found a considerable amount of additional evidence that linked him to the crime. One item was a notebook that contained a sketch of the construction of a ladder similar to that which was found at the Lindbergh home in March 1932. John Condon's telephone number, along with his address, were discovered written on a closet wall in the house. A key piece of evidence, a section of wood, was discovered in the attic of the home. After being examined by an expert, it was determined to be an exact match to the wood used in the construction of the ladder found at the scene of the crime.

Hauptmann was indicted in the Bronx on September 24, 1934, for extorting the $50,000 ransom from Charles Lindbergh. Two weeks later, on October 8, Hauptmann was indicted in New Jersey for the murder of Charles Augustus Lindbergh Jr. Two days later, he was surrendered to New Jersey authorities by New York Governor Herbert H. Lehman to face charges directly related to the kidnapping and murder of the child. Hauptmann was moved to the Hunterdon County Jail in Flemington, New Jersey, on October 19.

Trial and execution

Trial

Hauptmann was charged with capital murder. The trial was held at the Hunterdon County Courthouse in Flemington, New Jersey, and was soon dubbed the "Trial of the Century". Reporters swarmed the town, and every hotel room was booked. Judge Thomas Whitaker Trenchard presided over the trial.

In exchange for rights to publish Hauptmann's story in their newspaper, Edward J. Reilly was hired by the New York Daily Mirror to serve as Hauptmann's attorney. David T. Wilentz, Attorney General of New Jersey, led the prosecution.

Evidence against Hauptmann included $20,000 of the ransom money found in his garage and testimony alleging that his handwriting and spelling were similar to those of the ransom notes. Eight handwriting experts, including Albert S. Osborn, pointed out similarities between the ransom notes and Hauptmann's writing specimens. The defense called an expert to rebut this evidence, while two others declined to testify; the latter two demanded $500 before looking at the notes and were dismissed when Lloyd Fisher, a member of Hauptmann's legal team, declined. Other experts retained by the defense were never called to testify.

On the basis of the work of Arthur Koehler at the Forest Products Laboratory, the State introduced photographs demonstrating that part of the wood from the ladder matched a plank from the floor of Hauptmann's attic: the type of wood, the direction of tree growth, the milling pattern, the inside and outside surface of the wood, and the grain on both sides were identical, and four oddly placed nail holes lined up with nail holes in joists in Hauptmann's attic. Condon's address and telephone number were written in pencil on a closet door in Hauptmann's home, and Hauptmann told police that he had written Condon's address:

A sketch that Wilentz suggested represented a ladder was found in one of Hauptmann's notebooks. Hauptmann said this picture and other sketches therein were the work of a child.

Despite not having an obvious source of earned income, Hauptmann had bought a $400 radio (approximately ) and sent his wife on a trip to Germany.

Hauptmann was identified as the man to whom the ransom money was delivered. Other witnesses testified that it was Hauptmann who had spent some of the Lindbergh gold certificates; that he had been seen in the area of the estate, in East Amwell, New Jersey, near Hopewell, on the day of the kidnapping; and that he had been absent from work on the day of the ransom payment and had quit his job two days later. Hauptmann never sought another job afterward, yet continued to live comfortably.

When the prosecution rested its case, the defense opened with a lengthy examination of Hauptmann. In his testimony, Hauptmann denied being guilty, insisting that the box of gold certificates had been left in his garage by a friend, Isidor Fisch, who had returned to Germany in December 1933 and died there in March 1934. Hauptmann said that he had one day found a shoe box left behind by Fisch, which Hauptmann had stored on the top shelf of his kitchen broom closet, later discovering the money, which he later found to be almost $40,000 (approximately ). Hauptmann said that, because Fisch had owed him about $7,500 in business funds, Hauptmann had kept the money for himself and had lived on it since January 1934.

The defense called Hauptmann's wife, Anna, to corroborate the Fisch story. On cross-examination, she admitted that while she hung her apron every day on a hook higher than the top shelf, she could not remember seeing any shoe box there. Later, rebuttal witnesses testified that Fisch could not have been at the scene of the crime, and that he had no money for medical treatments when he died of tuberculosis. Fisch's landlady testified that he could barely afford the $3.50 weekly rent of his room.

In his closing summation, Reilly argued that the evidence against Hauptmann was entirely circumstantial, because no reliable witness had placed Hauptmann at the scene of the crime, nor were his fingerprints found on the ladder, on the ransom notes, or anywhere in the nursery.

Appeals
Hauptmann was convicted and immediately sentenced to death. His attorneys appealed to the New Jersey Court of Errors and Appeals, which at the time was the state's highest court; the appeal was argued on June 29, 1935.

New Jersey Governor Harold G. Hoffman secretly visited Hauptmann in his cell on the evening of October 16, accompanied by a stenographer who spoke German fluently. Hoffman urged members of the Court of Errors and Appeals to visit Hauptmann.

In late January 1936, while declaring that he held no position on the guilt or innocence of Hauptmann, Hoffman cited evidence that the crime was not a "one person" job and directed Schwarzkopf to continue a thorough and impartial investigation in an effort to bring all parties involved to justice.

It became known among the press that on March 27, Hoffman was considering a second reprieve of Hauptmann's death sentence and was seeking opinions about whether the governor had the right to issue a second reprieve.

On March 30, 1936, Hauptmann's second and final appeal asking for clemency from the New Jersey Board of Pardons was denied. Hoffman later announced that this decision would be the final legal action in the case, and that he would not grant another reprieve. Nonetheless, there was a postponement, when the Mercer County grand jury, investigating the confession and arrest of Trenton attorney, Paul Wendel, requested a delay from Warden Mark Kimberling. This, the final stay, ended when the Mercer County prosecutor informed Kimberling that the grand jury had adjourned after voting to end its investigation without charging Wendel.

Execution
Hauptmann turned down a large offer from a Hearst newspaper for a confession and refused a last-minute offer to commute his sentence from the death penalty to life without parole in exchange for a confession. He was electrocuted on April 3, 1936.

After his death, some reporters and independent investigators came up with numerous questions about the way in which the investigation had been run and the fairness of the trial, including witness tampering and planted evidence. Twice in the 1980s, Anna Hauptmann sued the state of New Jersey for the unjust execution of her husband. The suits were dismissed due to prosecutorial immunity and because the statute of limitations had run out. She continued fighting to clear his name until her death, at age 95, in 1994.

Alternative theories
A number of books have asserted Hauptmann's innocence, generally highlighting inadequate police work at the crime scene, Lindbergh's interference in the investigation, the ineffectiveness of Hauptmann's counsel, and weaknesses in the witnesses and physical evidence. Ludovic Kennedy, in particular, questioned much of the evidence, such as the origin of the ladder and the testimony of many of the witnesses.

According to author Lloyd Gardner, a fingerprint expert, Erastus Mead Hudson, applied the then-rare silver nitrate fingerprint process to the ladder and did not find Hauptmann's fingerprints, even in places that the maker of the ladder must have touched. According to Gardner, officials refused to consider this expert's findings, and the ladder was then washed of all fingerprints.

Jim Fisher, a former FBI agent and professor at Edinboro University of Pennsylvania, has written two books, The Lindbergh Case (1987) and The Ghosts of Hopewell (1999), addressing what he calls a "revision movement" regarding the case. He summarizes:

Another book, Hauptmann's Ladder: A step-by-step analysis of the Lindbergh kidnapping by Richard T. Cahill Jr., concludes that Hauptmann was guilty but questions whether he should have been executed.

According to John Reisinger in Master Detective, New Jersey detective Ellis Parker conducted an independent investigation in 1936 and obtained a signed confession from former Trenton attorney Paul Wendel, creating a sensation and resulting in a temporary stay of execution for Hauptmann. The case against Wendel collapsed, however, when he insisted his confession had been coerced.

Another theory is Lindbergh accidentally killed his son in a prank gone wrong. In Crime of the Century: The Lindbergh Kidnapping Hoax, criminal defense attorney Gregory Ahlgren posits Lindbergh climbed a ladder and brought his son out of a window, but dropped the child, killing him, so hid the body in the woods, then covered up the crime by blaming Hauptmann.

Robert Zorn's 2012 book Cemetery John proposes that Hauptmann was part of a conspiracy with two other German-born men, John and Walter Knoll. Zorn's father, economist Eugene Zorn, believed that as a teenager he had witnessed the conspiracy being discussed.

In popular culture

In novels
 1934: Agatha Christie was inspired by circumstances of the case when she described the kidnapping of baby girl Daisy Armstrong in her Hercule Poirot novel Murder on the Orient Express.
 1981: The kidnapping and its aftermath served as the inspiration for Maurice Sendak's book Outside Over There.
 1993: In the novel Along Came a Spider by James Patterson and the film based on the novel, a character takes inspiration from the Lindbergh kidnapping for his crime.
 2013: The Aviator's Wife by Melanie Benjamin is a work of historical fiction told from the perspective of Anne Morrow Lindbergh.

In music
 May 1932: Just one day after the Lindbergh baby was discovered murdered, the prolific country recording artist Bob Miller (under the pseudonym Bob Ferguson) recorded two songs for Columbia on May 13, 1932, commemorating the event. The songs were released on Columbia 15759-D with the titles "Charles A. Lindbergh, Jr." and "There's a New Star Up in Heaven (Baby Lindy Is Up There)".

In film
 1996: Crime of the Century
 2011: The kidnapping, investigation and trial are featured in J. Edgar, the biopic of J.  Edgar Hoover, Director of the FBI (directed by Clint Eastwood and starring Leonardo DiCaprio).

In television
 1976: The Lindbergh Kidnapping Case

 American Horror Story season 1

See also
 List of kidnappings
 List of solved missing person cases

Explanatory notes

General and cited references

Citations

External links
 
 
 

1930s missing person cases
1932 crimes in the United States
1932 in New Jersey
1932 murders in the United States
20th-century American trials
Charles Lindbergh
Child abduction in the United States
Federal Bureau of Investigation
Formerly missing people
Incidents of violence against boys
Infanticide
 
Kidnappings in the United States
Male murder victims
March 1932 events
Missing person cases in New Jersey
Murder in New Jersey
Violence against children